Isabelle Olive is a French athlete, born 19 May 1960, who ran for the club de Earp Romans and then for CS Bourgoin-Jallieu, who specialized in Ultramarathons. Her French successor was Martine Cubizolles on the international ultramarathon scene. She had the second best French performance over 100 km in 1997, with 7:40:09 hours.

International competitions
 IAU 100 km World Championships runner-up in 1994 and 1997 (3rd in 1993)
 World champion 100 km road team in 1997 and 1999  (2nd in 1994 and 1998)
 IAU 100 km European Championships winner 1995
 European champion 100 km road team in 1995,  1996  (2nd 1994)
 100 km Vendée in 1995
 Marathon Drome in 2004
 Winner of the international trail gendarmes et les voleurs du temps  in 2003
 4th  (2nd European woman) in Solukhumbu trail  2011
 Today Isabelle Olive is a professor at the school Louis Pasteur in Bourg de Peage

References

1960 births
Living people
Place of birth missing (living people)
French female long-distance runners
French ultramarathon runners
Female ultramarathon runners